Esherick Homsey Dodge and Davis (also known as EHDD Architecture) is a United States-based architecture, interiors, planning and urban design firm.  EHDD, ranked among the top 20 architecture firms in the San Francisco Bay Area, where it is headquartered, is known especially for seismically safe, sustainable designs. From its early residential work, to The Sea Ranch and Monterey Bay Aquarium, to more recent LEED certified and net-zero buildings, the firm is recognized for collaboration, commitment to innovation and investigation, and responsiveness to location, light, and climate.

History
EHDD grew out of a practice founded in 1946 by the late American architect Joseph Esherick (1914–1998). Esherick began his career designing houses for the architect Gardner Dailey and maintained an interest in private residences throughout his life. He taught at the University of California, Berkeley (1952–1985), was among the faculty who supported William Wurster's founding of the College of Environmental Design in 1959, and served as chair of the Architecture Department (1976–1982). Esherick received the AIA Gold Medal in 1989 and the first AIA California Council Maybeck Award in 1992.

In 1951, George W. Homsey joined Joseph Esherick, followed by adding Peter Dodge in 1956, and Chuck Davis in 1962. In 1963 the firm became Joseph Esherick and Associates reflecting their partnership. The firm's early years were primarily devoted to residential work. By the mid-1960s the firm was taking on larger and more complex projects particularly in higher education but in other sectors as well. In 1972, Joseph Esherick and Associates became Esherick Homsey Dodge and Davis.

In the late 1970s, the firm was commissioned to design Monterey Bay Aquarium which opened in 1984 and won the National Honor Award from the American Institute of Architects (AIA) in 1988. This proved to be a seminal project, expanding the firm's involvement in large aquarium, zoo and museum projects. Through the 1980s and continuing to the present, the firm's work has included a wide range of building types and scales in both the public and private sectors. Esherick Homsey Dodge and Davis was given the AIA California Council Firm Award in 1980 and the AIA National Firm of the Year Award in 1986. The AIA California Council awarded the Maybeck Award to Chuck Davis in 2003 and to George Homsey in 2006. Peter Dodge received the AIA Council Lifetime Achievement Award for Distinguished Service in 2008.

With Joseph Esherick's passing in 1998, the firm began to change its management structure and implement a succession plan. George Homsey and Peter Dodge became independent consultants in 1995. In 2001, Duncan Ballash, Jennifer Devlin and Marc L'Italien became principals and Scott Shell became principal in 2006. While building on the legacy of the founder and original principals, in order to better reflect the changes in leadership, the firm adopted the name EHDD architecture.

Since its inception the firm has garnered more than 200 design awards and honors. In addition to 11 LEED certified buildings, among them 5 LEED Platinum certified projects, the firm has been awarded over 30 sustainable design awards including three Center for the Built Environment awards and three AIA Committee on the Environment (COTE) Top Ten Green Building awards.

Notable buildings

 Aquarium of the Pacific
 Audubon Center at Debs Park
 Bermak House, Oakland, California
 California Science Center, Ecosystems Wing (with ZGF)
 California State University, Bakersfield, Walter Stiern Library
 California State University, Monterey Bay, Tanimura and Antle Family Memorial Library
 Carnegie Institution for Science, Department of Global Ecology (Stanford, California)
 Cary House
 Chartwell School
 City College of San Francisco, Chinatown/North Beach Campus (with Barcelon and Jang)
 David and Lucile Packard Foundation (The) [2011]
 Exploratorium at Piers 15 / 17
 F10 House
 Lincoln Park Zoo, Pritzker Family Children's Zoo
 Marin Country Day School
 Mills College, Betty Irene Moore Natural Sciences Building
 Monterey Bay Aquarium
 Napier House
 National Mississippi River Museum & Aquarium
 National Museum of Marine Biology & Aquarium (Taiwan)
 One Hawthorne
 Residences at Spanish Bay (The)
 San Mateo Public Library
 Schneider House (The Sea Ranch)
 Sea Ranch (The)
 Shedd Aquarium
 Stanford University, Kavli Institute for Particle Astrophysics and Cosmology
 University of California, Berkeley, Clark Kerr Campus Renewal
 University of California, Berkeley, College of Environmental Design (Wurster Hall)
 University of California, Berkeley, Main Library Complex, Doe/Moffitt Libraries
 University of California, Berkeley, Residence Halls Units I &  II
 University of California, Merced, Science + Engineering Building
 University of California, San Diego, Supercomputer Center Expansion
 University of California, San Francisco, Kalmanovitz Library
 University of California, Santa Barbara, Ocean Science Education Building [2011]
 University of California, Santa Cruz, Colleges 9 & 10 Residences and Dining Hall / University Center
 University of California, Santa Cruz, Science Library
 University of California, Santa Cruz, Biomedical Sciences Building [2012]
 University of California, Santa Cruz, Stevenson College
 Utah State University, Logan, Merrill-Cazier Library
 Valparaiso University, Indiana, Christopher Center for Library and Information Resources

Awards
 AIA National Honor Award, 1988
 AIA National Firm of the Year Award, 1986
 AIA COTE Top Ten – Chartwell School [2009]
 AIA COTE Top Ten – Carnegie Institution for Science, Department of Global Ecology [2007]
 AIA COTE Top Ten – F10 House [2004]
 AIA SF Honor Award, 2011 – Marin Country Day School, Step 2
 CBE livable building awards honorable mention 2010 – Kavli Institute for Particle Astrophysics and Cosmology
 CBE livable building awards winner 2009 – Chartwell School
 CBE livable building awards winner 2007 – Carnegie Institution for Science, Department of Global Ecology
 The Chicago Athenaeum: Museum of Architecture and Design / The European Centre for Architecture Art Design and Urban Studies  Design Excellence Award, 2007 – Lincoln Park Zoo, Pritzker Family Children’s Zoo

Notes

References

 Joseph Esherick: an Architectural Practice in the San Francisco Bay Area, 1938-1996. Interviews by Suzanne Riess. Berkeley: Regional History Office, The Bancroft Library, University of California (1996)
 Moore, Charles. "The End of Arcadia" in Bay Area Houses, edited by Sally Woodbridge. New York: Oxford University Press (1976)
 Schwarzer, Mitchell. San Francisco: Architecture of the San Francisco Bay Area: a History & Guide. San Francisco: William Stout Publishers (2007)

External links
 www.EHDD.com
 EHDD at GreatBuildings.com
 Joseph Esherick at GreatBuildings.com
 EHDD at archiplanet.org

Architecture firms based in California
Design companies established in 1946
1946 establishments in California
Architecture in the San Francisco Bay Area